ObliqSound is a record label in New York City.

It was founded by Tobias Tanner, Michele Locatelli, and Ralf Schmid. They studied music together at the New School in Manhattan. Their intent with Obliqsound is to produce musicians with a background in jazz whose music crosses genres. The roster includes Gilfema, which consists of Lionel Loueke, a guitarist from Benin; Massimo Biolcati, a Swedish-Italian bassist, and drummer Ferenc Nemeth from Hungary. Other atypical acts are Maori singer Tama Waipara and Flügelschlag!, a group from Germany which uses three pianos.

Roster 
 Aisha Duo
 Massimo Biolcati
 Ablaye Cissoko
 Anne Drummond
 Gilfema
 Luigi Bonafede
 Bebo Ferra
 Volker Goetze
 Lionel Loueke
 Grégoire Maret
 Andy Milne
 Grand Pianoramax
 Gretchen Parlato
 Paolino Dalla Porta 
 Tobias Preisig
 Renovation Unlimited
 John Shannon
 Somi
 Tales in Tones Trio
 Tama Waipara
 Pietro Tonolo
 Max Wild
 Alon Yavnai

Sub-labels
 Backdrop

References

External links
 Official website

See also
 List of record labels

American independent record labels
Jazz record labels